Cyrtodactylus adleri is a species of bent-toed gecko, a lizard in the family Gekkonidae. The species is native to southern Asia.

Etymology
The specific name, adleri, is in honor of American herpetologist Kraig Adler (born 1940).

Geographic range
C. adleri is found in the Nicobar Islands of India.

Habitat
The preferred natural habitat of C. adleri is forest.

Description
C. adleri was earlier thought to be conspecific with C. rubidus. It can be differentiated from it by its dark spots (vs. dark bands) on the dorsum; differences in the midventral and postnasal scales; and presence of the pre-anal groove.

Behavior
C. adleri is nocturnal and arboreal.

Reproduction
C. adleri is oviparous.

References

Further reading
Chandramouli SR (2020). "A review of the Gekkonid genus Cyrtodactylus Gray, 1827 (Sauria: Gekkonidae) in the Andaman and Nicobar archipelago with the description of two new species from the Nicobar Islands". Asian Journal of Conservation Biology 9 (1): 78–89.
Rösler H (2000). "Kommentierte Liste der rezent, subrezent und fossil bekannten Geckotaxa (Reptilia: Gekkonomorpha)". Gekkota 2; 28–153. (Cyrtodactylus adleri, p. 64). (in German).

Cyrtodactylus
Endemic fauna of the Nicobar Islands
Reptiles of India
Reptiles described in 1997
Lizards of Asia